Duan Siying (June 1917 – December 25, 2007) was a People's Liberation Army major general and People's Republic of China politician. He was born in Yanchuan County, Yan'an, Shaanxi Province. He was Communist Party of China Committee Secretary and Mayor of Chongqing.

1917 births
2007 deaths
People's Republic of China politicians from Shaanxi
Chinese Communist Party politicians from Shaanxi
People's Liberation Army generals from Shaanxi
Mayors of Chongqing
Political office-holders in Chongqing
Delegates to the 5th National People's Congress